School District 207 may refer to:
 Maine Township High School District 207 
 Fort Leavenworth Unified School District 207
 Peotone School District 207-U